Paul Nicholas "Lefty" Masterson (October 16, 1915 – November 27, 1997) was a Major League Baseball pitcher. Masterson played for the Philadelphia Phillies from 1940 to 1942.

Masterson entered professional baseball in 1937 making his Major League debut with the Phillies on September 15, 1940. His only decision came on September 23, 1941, when the Phillies hosted the New York Giants at Shibe Park. Tossing a complete game, he earned the victory in the 8–2 final.

Masterson died in Chicago, the city of his birth, on November 27, 1997, aged 82.

References

External links

Philadelphia Phillies players
1915 births
1997 deaths
Baseball players from Illinois